Euryattus bleekeri, known as Bleeker's jumping spider, is a species of spider in the family Salticidae (jumping spiders). It is found from Sri Lanka to Queensland.

Description
The male is smaller than the female, being generally about 6 mm in total length, whereas female is 12 mm. The adult mature spider has flat-fronted smooth dark black chelicerae and more black or orange opisthosoma. The female has less vivid coloration than the male, but with prominent orange markings on opisthosoma. Juvenile males are often more orange-brown than adults. Both male and female possess a whitish scaly band around the rear part of the carapace and the leading edge of the abdomen.

Ecology
They do not form a web to capture prey. Bleeker's jumping spider builds a flat, densely woven egg sac and places it near the nest and in rolled up leaves. Their common habitats include dense shrubs and complex vines around coastal areas or near water courses.

Toxicity
There are no records of bites causing serious harm to humans but they may sometimes cause local pain and inflammation.

Gallery

References

External links
The retinae of Ewyattus bleekeri, an aberrant salticid spider from Queensland 

Salticidae
Spiders of Australia
Spiders of Asia
Spiders described in 1859